The Ghana men's national handball team is the national men's handball team of Ghana.

International record
Ghana qualified three times for African Games
  in 1999
 6th in 2003
 12th in 2011
 qualified as host in 2023

Ghana never qualified for African Championship

References

External links
IHF profile

Men's national handball teams
National sports teams of Ghana